Zarrin Ju may refer to:

Zarrin Ju, Kermanshah
Zarrin Ju, Kurdistan
Zarrin Ju, Lorestan